Aylin is a Turkish female given name. It is sometimes used as a given name in the English-speaking world in modern times. (Also spelled as Aelyn, Ailyn, Ailynn and Aylinn.) The name Aylin also carries the meaning of; “Moon Halo" or, "The one that belongs to the moon”. Other related names are Ailin, Ayla, Tülin Aileen, Eileen, Ayleen.

People
 Aylin Aslım (born 1976), Turkish singer/songwriter
 Aylin Daşdelen (born 1982), European champion Turkish female weightlifter
 Aylin Kösetürk (born 1993), Austrian fashion model of Turkish descent
 Aylin Yaren (born 1989), German-Turkish female football player
 Aylin Langreuter (born 1976), German conceptual artist
 Aylín Mújica (born 1974), Cuban actress, model, and ballet dancer
 Aylin Yıldızoğlu (born 1975), Turkish female basketball player
 Aylin Nazlıaka (born 1968), Turkish businesswoman, politician, and MP with the Republican People's Party (CHP)
 Aylin Sarıoğlu (born 1995), Turkish volleyball player
 Ailin Salas (born 1993), Argentinian-Brazilian actress
 Aylin Tezel (born 1983), German actress
 Aylin Yıldızoğlu (born 1975), Turkish female basketball player
 Süreyya Aylin Antmen (born 1981), contemporary Turkish poet and writer

Fictional characters
 Aylin Devrimel (1938–1995), protagonist of Ayşe Kulin's novel, Adı: Aylin

Turkish feminine given names